FRV may refer to:
 Fast Response Vehicle
 Fire Rescue Victoria
 Fisheries research vessel
 FR-V (microprocessor)
 Honda FR-V